Ven (sign: VEN) is a representative digital currency. Its origin was as a community currency created by the Hub Culture social network. It claims the value of Ven is determined by backing currencies, commodities and assets. Because the currency is privately run, the true value is impossible to verify.  It trades against major currencies at floating exchange rates. Ven was listed as of 2014 on the LMAX Exchange.

History
Hub Culture launched Ven on 4 July 2007. In 2009, The Wall Street Journal described the currency as being pegged to the US dollar, and used by Hub Culture's users to trade goods, services, and knowledge. One user described having been paid in Ven for making introductions and other favors.

In May 2010, carbon pricing contracts were introduced to the weighted basket that determines the value of Ven.

In April 2011 Hub Culture announced the first carbon offset credit trade priced in Ven, between American Carbon Registry (ACR), a carbon registry run by Winrock International, and Mata no Peito, an environmental coalition that includes ACR and Hub Culture as partners. In September 2011, Hub Culture announced that Ven would be available on Thomson Reuters' data network and terminals.

In November 2011, Hub Culture announced the availability of diamonds, investment grade wines and Ven Gold, a retail gold product sold in individual 1 oz. 22 karat units.

In 2012, Hub Culture announced the development of Ven Funds, derivative financial products based on the Ven, including micro-finance and commodity asset pools.

In January 2014, Ven became the first digital currency to begin trading in regulated Forex markets, on LMAX Exchange.

According to leaked emails, Stan Stalnaker pitched Ven as a fundraising tool for Hillary Clinton's campaign in May 2015. Campaign chairman John Podesta expressed interest in this offer, but no meeting was scheduled due to time constraints.

Hub Culture claims that the spread backing makes its value stable. The company also claims that as part of the basket includes carbon futures, estimated at 7%, Ven is environmentally friendly.

See also

 Complementary currency

References

Alternative currencies
Digital currencies
Private currencies